Marshmallow Mateys (also known as  MarshMateys from the Nestlé cereal company in the UK) is an American brand of cereal produced by the MOM Brands food company located in Minneapolis, Minnesota. The company presented their first line of ready-to-eat cereals in 1965. Marshmallow Mateys includes marshmallow shapes in various colors.

The oat morsels are formed in the shape of boat anchors; the marshmallow bits may be variously: dolphins (aqua blue & white), dubloons (orange & yellow), gems (red & orange), jewels (purple & white), parrots (yellow), pirate heads in tricorne hats (yellow & red), shovels (orange), starfish (pink & white), tropical fish (green striped).

History
Malt-O-Meal dates back to 1919 when John S. Campbell developed a hot wheat breakfast cereal he called Malt-O-Meal. The company officially adopted the name The Malt-O-Meal Company in 1953 (renamed MOM Brands in February 2012). By 1965, the company had entered the ready-to-eat non-hot breakfast sector with the introduction of Puffed Rice and Puffed Wheat cereals. While the company is best known for its line of hot cereals, it derives a large percentage of its sales from its 20-plus discount-priced bagged cold cereals, many of which are imitations of better-known national brands.

See also
 List of breakfast cereals

References

External links
 Malt-O-Meal Marshmallow Matey site: Includes recipes, product comparison, and nutrition facts.

MOM Brands brands
Products introduced in 1966